This is a list of Ghanaian writers.

A
 Joseph Wilfred Abruquah (1920–1997), novelist  
 Geormbeeyi Adali-Mortty (1916–), poet
 Kobena Eyi Acquah (1952–), poet
 Kofi Acquah-Dadzie (1939–), jurist, and writer  
 Francis Agbodeka (1931–2005), academic and writer 
 Jot Agyeman, media practitioner
Ivor Agyeman-Duah (1966–), academic, writer, editor and film director
 Ama Ata Aidoo (1940–), playwright, poet, fiction writer and critic 
 Kofi Akpabli (1973–), journalist, publisher, and travel writer.
 Kofi Aidoo (1950–), short story writer
 Mohammed Naseehu Ali (1971–), short story and non-fiction writer
 Joseph Godson Amamoo (1931–), journalist and author
 Anton Wilhelm Amo (c.1703–c.1759), philosopher
 T. E. Anin, economist and author 
 Kofi Anyidoho (1947–), poet and academic 
 Anthony Appiah (1954–), philosopher, cultural theorist and novelist
 Ayi Kwei Armah (1939–), novelist  
 T. Q. Armar (1915–2000), publisher and textbook writer
 Raphael Armattoe (1913–1953), poet 
 Portia Arthur (1990–), author, writer and reporter
 Bediako Asare (1930–), journalist and non-fiction writer also connected with Tanzania
 Meshack Asare (1945–), children's writer
 Yaw Asare (1953–2002), dramatist and director
 Mary Asabea Ashun (1968–), novelist
 Akwasi Bretuo Assensoh (1946–), journalist and historian
 Ayesha Harruna Attah (1983–), novelist
 Kofi Awoonor (1935–2013), poet, novelist and critic  
Nana Oforiatta Ayim, novelist and art historian

B
 Adwoa Badoe, dancer and author
 Yaba Badoe (1955–), novelist and filmmaker
 Elizabeth-Irene Baitie (1970–), writer of fiction for young adults.
 Kofi Batsa (1931–1991)
 Mohammed Ben-Abdallah (1944–), playwright
 J. Benibengor Blay (1915–), popular novelist, playwright and poet 
 William Boyd (1952–), novelist
 Kwesi Brew (1928–2007), poet 
 Nana Brew-Hammond, journalist, poet, playwright and screenwriter
 Roseanne A. Brown (1995–), journalist and novelist. 
 Margaret Busby, publisher, editor and dramatist
 Abena Busia (1953–), poet and academic
 Akosua Busia (1966–), actress, novelist and screenwriter
Empi Baryeh, novelist

C
 Jacobus Capitein (1717–1747), minister and writer on slavery 
 Adelaide Smith Casely-Hayford (1868–1960), short story writer and educator
 Gladys May Casely-Hayford (1901–1950), poet 
 Gus Casely-Hayford, cultural historian
 J. E. Casely-Hayford (1866–1930), politician and novelist  
 Jojo Cobbinah (1948–)
 Rita Akoto Coker (1953–), African romance novelist
 Quobna Ottobah Cugoano (1757?–1801?), freed slave and autobiographer

D
 J. B. Danquah (1895–1965), scholar, lawyer and politician 
 Mabel Dove Danquah (1910–1984), short story writer and journalist
 Meri Nana-Ama Danquah (1967–), editor, journalist, memoirist
 Amma Darko (1956–), novelist
 Nana Awere Damoah (1975–), author, poet and non-fiction writer
 Lawrence Darmani (1956–), novelist, poet, playwright, inspirational writer
 Kwame Dawes (1962–), poet, critic
 Joe de Graft (1924–1978), playwright and poet 
 Michael Dei-Anang (1909–1977), poet, playwright and novelist  
 Amu Djoleto (1929–), novelist, poet and educator 
 Komla Dumor (1972–2014), journalist
 Cameron Duodu (1937–), journalist, novelist and poet 
 Dag Heward Mills(1963–), minister, popular author
 Mark K Darko (1956–), author, missionary anthropologist

F
 Ferdinand Kwasi Fiawoo (1891–1969), playwright 
 Shirley Frimpong-Manso (1977–)

G
 Yaa Gyasi (1989–), novelist

H
 Manu Herbstein (1936–), novelist
 Dag Heward-Mills (1963–), theologian
 Afua Hirsch (1981–), journalist

K
 Ellis Ayitey Komey (1927–1972), poet and short story writer
 Asare Konadu (1932–1994), novelist  
 Benjamin Kwakye (1967–), novelist and poet

L
 B. Kojo Laing (1946–2017), novelist and poet 
 Lesley Lokko, (1964–), novelist, architect and academic

M
 Tawiah M'carthy, playwright
 John Dramani Mahama (1958–), politician and memoirist
 Bill Okyere Marshall (1936–2021), playwright and novelist  
 Peace Adzo Medie, writer
 John Atta Mills (1944–2012), politician and legal scholar
 Dayan Kodua, actress and model

N
 J. H. Kwabena Nketia (1921–2019), ethnomusicologist
 Gamal Nkrumah (1959–), journalist and editor
 Kwame Nkrumah (1909–1972), politician and political theorist

O
 Richard Emmanuel Obeng (1877–1951), novelist and textbook writer
 Nana Oforiatta Ayim, art historian, filmmaker
 (John) Atukwei Okai (1941–2018), poet   
 Kwesi Owusu (b. 1950s), author and filmmaker

P
 Frank Kobina Parkes (1932–2005), poet 
 Nii Ayikwei Parkes (1974–), poet, novelist
 Portia Dery, writer

Q
 Kwei Quartey, physician and writer
 Rex Quartey (1944–2015), writer and poet
 Ato Quayson (1961–), academic and literary critic

R
 Carl Christian Reindorf (1834–1917), pastor and historian

S
 John Mensah Sarbah (1864–1910)
 Kobina Sekyi (1892–1956), politician and writer 
 Ato Sekyi-Otu (born 1941)
 Taiye Selasi (1979–), novelist
 Francis Selormey (1927–1988), novelist   
 Efua Theodora Sutherland (1924–1996), playwright  
 Nana Sandy Achampong (1964–) novelist, poet and academic

W

 Kwasi Wiredu (1931–2022), philosopher

Y
 Asiedu Yirenkyi (1942–2018), playwright
 Scofray Nana Yaw Yeboah (1980–), columnist

References

Ghanaian
Writers